Nososticta kalumburu is a species of Australian damselfly in the family Platycnemididae,
commonly known as a spot-winged threadtail. 
It has only been found in the Kimberley region of Western Australia, where it inhabits streams.

Nososticta kalumburu is a small, slender damselfly, that is coloured green-black with brown markings; males have wings with a strongly-defined dark band.

Gallery

See also
 List of Odonata species of Australia

References 

Platycnemididae
Odonata of Australia
Insects of Australia
Endemic fauna of Australia
Taxa named by J.A.L. (Tony) Watson
Taxa named by Günther Theischinger
Insects described in 1984
Damselflies